Kairaki is a small rural community in the Waimakariri District, New Zealand. 

The New Zealand Ministry for Culture and Heritage gives a translation of "sky eater" for Kairaki.

Demographics
It is part of the wider Pegasus Bay statistical area.

Kairaki had a population of 129 at the 2018 New Zealand census, a decrease of 3 people (-2.3%) since the 2013 census, and a decrease of 96 people (-42.7%) since the 2006 census. There were 66 households. There were 72 males and 57 females, giving a sex ratio of 1.26 males per female. The median age was 60 years (compared with 37.4 years nationally), with 6 people (4.7%) aged under 15 years, 9 (7.0%) aged 15 to 29, 66 (51.2%) aged 30 to 64, and 51 (39.5%) aged 65 or older.

Ethnicities were 95.3% European/Pākehā, 7.0% Māori, 2.3% Pacific peoples, and 2.3% Asian (totals add to more than 100% since people could identify with multiple ethnicities).

Although some people objected to giving their religion, 62.8% had no religion, 30.2% were Christian, and 2.3% were Muslim.

Of those at least 15 years old, 9 (7.3%) people had a bachelor or higher degree, and 51 (41.5%) people had no formal qualifications. The median income was $22,600, compared with $31,800 nationally. The employment status of those at least 15 was that 48 (39.0%) people were employed full-time, 18 (14.6%) were part-time, and 3 (2.4%) were unemployed.

Climate
The average temperature in summer is 16.2 °C, and in winter is 6.4 °C.

References

Waimakariri District
Populated places in Canterbury, New Zealand